State Route 318 (SR 318) is a short state highway in Hamilton County in the southeastern portion of the U.S. state of Tennessee. It serves as a connector between US 11 / US 41 / US 64 / US 72 and SR 148 and the Lookout Mountain tourist area.

Route description
SR 318 begins in the Tiftonia/Lookout Valley area of West Chattanooga at US 11/US 41/US 64/US 72. It is a narrow, winding mountain road that rises above the U.S. Highways which lie at the base of the mountain.  It ends at SR 148 north of the town of Lookout Mountain and the route travels near the eponymous mountain ridge of the same name.

Major intersections

References

318
Transportation in Hamilton County, Tennessee